William R. Turner (born February 18, 1944) is an American 6'7" retired American professional National Basketball Association player.  Turner played college basketball at University of Akron.

See also
Akron Zips men's basketball

External links
NBA stats @ basketballreference.com

1944 births
Living people
Akron Zips men's basketball players
Basketball players from Akron, Ohio
Cincinnati Royals players
Golden State Warriors players
Los Angeles Lakers players
New York Knicks draft picks
Portland Trail Blazers players
San Francisco Warriors draft picks
San Francisco Warriors players
Small forwards
American men's basketball players